Boussières is a commune in the Doubs department in the Bourgogne-Franche-Comté region in eastern France.

Politics and administration 
Boussières had been the seat of a canton until its attachment to the new Canton of Besançon-6.

Municipal government

Population

See also
 Communes of the Doubs department

References

Communes of Doubs